Camille Rast (born 9 July 1999) is a Swiss alpine ski racer.

References

1999 births
Living people
Swiss female alpine skiers
Alpine skiers at the 2022 Winter Olympics
Olympic alpine skiers of Switzerland
People from Sion, Switzerland
Sportspeople from Valais
21st-century Swiss women